The Macau Chinese Chamber of Commerce (abbr. ACM) is one of the most influential business associations in Macau. It was established on 8 January 1913 as the Macao Chamber of Commerce, and changed to its current name in 1916.

Origins 
Founded in the early 20th century, at the encouragement of the Qing government, the Chinese Chamber of Commerce was established with the approval of the Portuguese and Portuguese authorities. This chamber, the predecessor to the Macau Chinese Chamber of Commerce, sought to serve the business interests of the Chinese in the Portuguese territory until its founding charter was revoked in 1911 by the Portuguese colonial administration. Chinese businessmen, dissatisfied with the lack of representation in Macau, proposed an independent business association which was later approved on 14 December 1912 and formally established on 8 January 1913, as the Macao Chamber of Commerce.

Recent history 
The ACM is one of the three major pro-Beijing organisations which have dominated politics in Macau since the 1999 handover, the other two being the Macau Federation of Trade Unions and the General Union of Neighbourhood Associations of Macau.

References

Macau
Chambers of commerce